Chief Master Sergeant Wayne Fisk (born April 6, 1945) was directly involved in the famed Son Tay POW camp raid and the rescue of the crew of the SS Mayagüez. When the Mayagüez was hijacked by Cambodian Communist forces in May 1975, Fisk was a member of the assault force that successfully recovered the ship and the entrapped United States Marines. For his actions, he was presented with his second Silver Star. 

Concluding the Mayagüez mission, he was recognized as the last American serviceman to engage Communist forces in ground combat in Southeast Asia. In 1979, he was the first Air Force enlisted recipient of the US Jaycees Ten Outstanding Young Men of America. In 1986, he became the first director of the Air Force Enlisted Heritage Hall on Maxwell AFB-Gunter Annex.

Biography
Chief Master Sergeant Wayne Fisk was born in Waldport, Oregon, on April 6, 1945, and raised on the Oregon Coast. In high school, Wayne was a member of the honor society, an award-winning cadet in the Alaska Civil Air Patrol, and he even turned down an appointment to the United States Air Force Academy to care for his terminally ill mother. In March 1966, Fisk enlisted in the Air Force and was accepted for pararescue training. 

In 1967, he served at Eglin AFB, Florida, until assigned to the 40th Aerospace Rescue and Recovery Squadron (40th ARRS) at Udorn Royal Thai Air Force Base, Thailand performing combat rescue missions in both Laos and North Vietnam. One year later, he transferred to Kindley Air Force Base, Bermuda, as a member of the Air Force primary recovery team for Apollo missions 8, 9, and 10.

After only 11 months in Bermuda, Fisk voluntarily returned to Southeast Asia for two more consecutive tours with the 40th ARRS. It was during this time that then-Staff Sergeant Fisk participated in the famed Son Tay POW Camp Raid in November 1970 and received the Silver Star for his actions. From 1972 to 1974, he instructed at the USAF Pararescue School at Hill AFB, Utah, and was honored as the training wing's outstanding NCO instructor.

Fisk later returned to the 40th ARRS in Thailand as a Technical Sergeant and participated in Operation Eagle Pull, the evacuation of Phnom Penh, Cambodia. In May 1975, when Cambodian communist forces hijacked the Mayagüez in what came to be known as the Mayaguez incident. Fisk, flying aboard Knife 51, a 21st Special Operations Squadron CH-53, was a member of the assault force that successfully recovered the ship, attempted to rescue the crew, and liberated the entrapped US Marines. Knife 51 was the last helicopter to evacuate the Marines from Koh Tang and Fisk was the last Air Force serviceman to leave the ground having combed the beach for stragglers, Fisk received his second Silver Star for this operation. 

In January 1976, he moved to Clark AB, Philippines, to be an Assistant Team Chief, Team Chief, and Acting First Sergeant for Det 1, 33 Aerospace Rescue and Recovery Service (AARS). In 1979, Fisk was honored as the first USAF enlisted man named to the US Jaycees Ten Outstanding Young Men of America, the Military Airlift Command's Senior NCO of the Year, the US Air Force's Outstanding Airman in the Philippines; and a recipient of the Air Force Association's Citation of Honor. In October 1979 Fisk worked at Headquarters, Aerospace Rescue and Recovery Service, Scott AFB, Illinois, as the Pararescue Standardization and Evaluation Flight Examiner.

After a parachute injury in 1980, he left pararescue duty to serve as an instructor at the USAF Senior Noncommissioned Officer Academy, Gunter AFS, Alabama. As a newly minted Chief Master Sergeant, Fisk led the effort to establish the USAF Enlisted Heritage Hall and later became the director. His final Air Force assignment came when he was assigned as the Operations Coordinator in the Defense Attache Office, Embassy of the United States of America, Ottawa, Canada.

Fisk's awards and decorations include the Silver Star with oak leaf cluster, the Defense Superior Service Medal, the Legion of Merit, the Distinguished Flying Cross with oak leaf cluster, the Meritorious Service Medal with oak leaf cluster, and the Air Medal with 17 oak leaf clusters. Chief Fisk is married to the former Angelina Arceo from the Philippines. According to some sources, he is the father of the Pararescue tradition of getting tattoos of green footprints on one's buttocks.

Military awards and decorations

References

External links
 Veteran Tributes profile

1945 births
Living people
United States Air Force airmen
Recipients of the Silver Star
Recipients of the Legion of Merit
Recipients of the Distinguished Flying Cross (United States)
United States Air Force personnel of the Vietnam War
People from Lincoln County, Oregon
People of the Civil Air Patrol
Recipients of the Air Medal
Recipients of the Defense Superior Service Medal
Recipients of the Humanitarian Service Medal